The second Military Region is a military region of Armed Forces of Yemen. Its headquarters is in Mukalla, the capital of Hadramawt Governorate, eastern Yemen.

History 
The second region was established in 2013. As part of the military restructuring, former president Abdrabbuh Mansur Hadi issued a republication decree to divide the military field into seven regions, including the Second Military Region. The region is headquartered in Mukalla city and supervises the military units south of Hadramout Governorate, al-Maharah and Socotra Governorates.

Structure 
The region is composed of nine military units and brigades, including; 123th Infantry Brigade, 137th Mechanised Infantry Brigade, 27th Mechanised Infantry Brigade.

Leadership 

 Major General Mohsen Naser Qasem (2013–2015)
 Major General Farj Salmin al-Buhsani (2016– 13 August 2022)
 Major General Faiz Mansur Saeed ( 13 August 2022– incumbent)

See also 
 First Military Region

References 

Military regions of Yemen
Military units and formations established in 2013
2013 establishments in Yemen